Colchester—Hants was a federal electoral district in Nova Scotia, Canada, that was represented in the House of Commons of Canada from 1935 to 1968.

This riding was created in 1933 from Colchester and Hants—Kings. It consisted of the counties of Colchester and Hants. It was abolished in 1966 when it was redistributed into Annapolis Valley, Halifax—East Hants, and Cumberland—Colchester North ridings.

Members of Parliament

This riding elected the following Members of Parliament:

Election results

See also 

 List of Canadian federal electoral districts
 Past Canadian electoral districts

External links 
 Riding history for Colchester—Hants (1933–1966) from the Library of Parliament

Former federal electoral districts of Nova Scotia